Eupithecia acidalioides is a moth in the family Geometridae. It is found in Guadeloupe, Saint Martin, Trinidad and French Guiana.

It was first described in 1901 by William James Kaye in his preliminary catalogue of the moths of Trinidad. He described the species as having brownish cream wings, detailed a number of black and blackish markings, and listed a wingspan of 15 mm.

References

Moths described in 1901
acidalioides
Moths of the Caribbean
Moths of South America